The 2011 Cyprus Women's Cup was the fourth edition of the Cyprus Women's Cup, an invitational women's football tournament held annually in Cyprus.

Format
The twelve invited teams were split into three groups that played a round-robin tournament.  The main eight entrants were identical to the previous year. 

Groups A and B, containing the strongest ranked teams, were the only ones in contention to win the title. The group winners from A and B contested the final, with the runners-up playing for third place. The Group C winner faced the better 3rd place team from Groups A and B for 5th, with the Group C runner-up facing the other 3rd place team for 7th. Group C's 3rd place team faced the better 4th place team of Groups A and B, while the other two 4th place teams played in the 11th place match.

Points awarded in the group stage follow the standard formula of three points for a win, one point for a draw and zero points for a loss. In the case of two teams being tied on the same number of points in a group, their head-to-head result determined the higher place.

Group stage
All times local (EET/UTC+2)

Group A

Scotland's 2–0 victory against England was only their second win in the history of the fixture and their first since 1977.

Group B

Group C

Placement play-offs
All times local (EET/UTC+2)

11th Place

9th Place

7th Place

5th Place

3rd Place

Final

Champion

References

Cyprus
Women
2011